Tantawi is an Arabic surname (literally: person from Tanta) and may refer to:

Ahmed Tantawi, a member of the 2015–2020 Egyptian House of Representatives and of the 25-30 Alliance
Mohamed Hussein Tantawi (1935–2021), an Egyptian Field Marshal and politician. He was the commander-in-chief of the Egyptian Armed Forces and from February 2011 to June 2012 the head of the Supreme Council of the Armed Forces, the de facto ruler of Egypt.
Muhammad Sayyid Tantawy (1928–2010), Islamic scholar in Egypt. From 1986 to 1996, he was the grand Mufti of Egypt.

Arabic-language surnames